Eloise Klein Healy (born 1943) is an American poet.  She has published five books of poetry and three chapbooks. Her collection of poems, Passing, was a finalist for the 2003 Lambda Literary Awards in Poetry and the Audre Lorde Award from The Publishing Triangle. Healy has also received the Grand Prize of the Los Angeles Poetry Festival and has received six Pushcart Prize nominations.

Biography

Healy was born in 1943 in El Paso, Texas and grew up in rural Iowa. She was involved in the Woman's Building, the well known West Coast feminist cultural center, throughout the 1970s and 1980s in various capacities including as a teacher and a member of the Board of Directors. Healy became the first Poet Laureate of Los Angeles in 2012. She was instrumental in directing the women's studies program at Cal State Northridge, started the MFA program in creative writing at Antioch University, Los Angeles where she is professor emeritus, and founded Arktoi Books, an imprint of Red Hen Press.

Works

Individual works 
 Artemis In Echo Park: Poetry, Firebrand Books, 1991, 
 Building Some Changes, (chapbook), (A Beyond Baroque New Book), Beyond Baroque Foundation, 1976, OCLC: 2462676
 The Islands Project, Red Hen Press, 2007, 
 Ordinary Wisdom, Red Hen Press, 2005, 
 A Packet Beating Like a Heart, (chapbook), Books of a Feather, 1981, OCLC: 8463876
 Passing, Red Hen Press, 2002, 
 A Wild Surmise: New & Selected Poems & Recordings, Red Hen Press, 2013, 
 Women's Studies Chronicles (Laguna Poets Series, 99), The Inevitable Press, 1998,  (chapbook)

Anthologies including her writings 
 Another City: Writing from Los Angeles, ed. David L. Ulin, City Lights Publishers, 2001, 
 The Geography of Home: California's Poetry of Place, Heyday Books, 1999, 
 Grand Passion: Poets of Los Angeles and Beyond, principal ed., Suzanne Lummis, Red Wind Books, 1995, 
 Intimate Nature: The Bond Between Women and Animals, eds., Barbara Peterson, Brenda Peterson and Deena Metzger, Ballantine Books, 1999, 
 The World in Us: Lesbian and Gay Poetry of the Next Wave, eds., Michael Lassell, Elena Georgiou, St. Martin's Press, 2000,

References

Living people
Poets Laureate of Los Angeles
American women poets
American lesbian writers
American LGBT poets
1943 births
Chapbook writers
21st-century American women writers